UVIS may stand for 
 Unified Victim Identification System,
 Ultraviolet Imaging Spectrograph on Cassini spacecraft
 Under vehicle inspection system

See also
Uvis (given name), a Latvian masculine given name